This is a list of Spanish television related events in 1985.

Events 
 4 May: Paloma San Basilio represents Spain at the Eurovision Song Contest 1985, hold in Gothenburg ranking 14th with her song La fiesta terminó receiving 36 points.
 24 July: TVG, Galicia’s Regional Television channel, is launched.

Debuts

Television shows

La 1

Ending this year

La 1

Foreign series debuts in Spain

Births 
5 January - Matías Prats Chacón, sport journalist.
 10 January - Martín Rivas, actor.
 18 March - Alba Lago, hostess.
 21 April - Diego Losada Gómez, host.
 14 June - Flora González López, hostess.
 19 June - Sandra Cervera, actress.
 6 September - Jordi Coll, actor.
 6 October - Pepa Rus, actress.
 22 December - Edurne, singer, hostess & jury member.

Deaths 
 26 March - José Bódalo, actor, 69.

See also
1985 in Spain
List of Spanish films of 1985

References 

1985 in Spanish television